Natabari is a village and a gram panchayat  in the Tufanganj I CD block in the Tufanganj subdivision of the Cooch Behar district  in the state of West Bengal, India.

Geography

Location

Natabari I and Natabari II are gram panchayats in Tufanganj I CD block.

Area overview
The map alongside shows the eastern part of the district. In Tufanganj subdivision 6.97% of the population lives in the urban areas and 93.02% lives in the rural areas. In Dinhata subdivision 5.98% of the population lives in the urban areas and 94.02% lives in the urban areas. The entire district forms the flat alluvial flood plains of mighty rivers.

Note: The map alongside presents some of the notable locations in the subdivisions. All places marked in the map are linked in the larger full screen map.

Demographics
As per the 2011 Census of India, Natabari had a total population of 6,113.  There were 3,189 (52%) males and 2,924 (48%) females. There were 715 persons in the age range of 0 to 6 years. The total number of literate people in Natabari was 4,314 (79.92% of the population over 6 years).

Healthcare
Natabari Rural Hospital, with 30 beds at Natabari, is the major government medical facility in the Tufanganj I CD block.

References

Villages in Cooch Behar district